Barry S. Levy (born 1944) is a physician, a former president of the American Public Health Association. He has degrees from Tufts University, Harvard School of Public Health, and Weill Cornell Medicine.

With Victor W. Sidel, he is the author of War and Public Health, Terrorism and Public Health, and other books.

In 2015, he authored Climate Change and Public Health with Jonathan Patz.

Levy is a coauthor of Occupational and Environmental Health: Recognizing and Preventing Disease and Injury, a textbook in public health. Levy edited Preventing Occupational Disease and Injury (2005), published by the American Public Health Association.

Awards 
 2005 Sedgwick Memorial Medal

References 

American public health doctors
Living people
1944 births
University of Massachusetts Medical School faculty
Tufts University faculty
Tufts University alumni
Harvard School of Public Health alumni
Weill Cornell Medical College alumni
American writers